Binab (also Romanized as Bīnāb; also known as Benāb, Binababad, Bonāb, and Bonyāb) is a village in Bonab Rural District, in the Central District of Zanjan County, Zanjan Province, Iran. At the 2006 census, its population was 604, in 172 families.

References 

Populated places in Zanjan County